Carbacanthographis acanthoparaphysata is a species of corticolous (bark-dwelling) lichen in the family Graphidaceae. Found in Papua New Guinea, it was formally described as a new species in 2022 by Shirley Cunha Feuerstein and Robert Lücking. It is only known to occur at the type locality. The lichen has a whitish-grey to pale yellowish thallus lacking a cortex, but with a black prothallus. Its ascospores number eight per ascus, and are hyaline, measuring 17–20 by 8 μm; they have from 4 to 6 transverse septa and from 0 to 2 longitudinal septa. The specific epithet refers to the paraphyses, which give it an apically warty appearance. Carbacanthographis acanthoparaphysata contains protocetraric acid, a lichen product that can be detected using thin-layer chromatography.

References

acanthoparaphysata
Lichen species
Lichens described in 2022
Taxa named by Robert Lücking
Lichens of New Guinea